The Institute for Consumer Antitrust Studies is a non-partisan, independent academic center designed to explore the impact of antitrust enforcement on the individual consumer and public, and to shape policy issues.  It is located at Loyola University Chicago School of Law in Chicago, Illinois.

The School of Law created the institute in 1994 at the direction of then-dean Nina S. Appel, Professor Jane H. Locke, and a variety of other supporters.  Funding for the institute was provided via a cy pres award from the late United States District Judge Hubert Will with funds remaining from a large antitrust settlement.  In 2009, the institute celebrated its 15th anniversary.

Beginning in 2000, Professor Spencer Waller became director of the institute.  Professor Waller has authored numerous scholarly articles and several books on the subject of antitrust.  Prior to joining the institute, Professor Waller served as associate dean at Brooklyn Law School.  In addition to teaching, Professor Waller practiced with the United States Department of Justice Antitrust and Criminal Divisions and with the Chicago law firm of Freeborn & Peters.

Shaping the Future of Competition and Consumer Law and Policy, an online brochure, lists the antitrust- and consumer protection-focused courses offered at Loyola University Chicago School of Law, detailed descriptions of the student fellow and senior research fellow programs, and also chronicles the institute's involvement with the local and international competition communities.

Fellowship

Student Fellowship and Certificate Programs

The institute promotes the study and discussion of consumer and competition law issues through its Student Fellowship Program, which began in January 2001. Fellows are law students chosen from among applicants who meet certain minimum requirements, including academic achievement (fellows must be in the top one-third of their class), an interest in pursuing a career in antitrust or consumer protection, and complete requisite coursework.[3] The institute provides fellows with a stipend.

Fellows attend all institute events as well as special programs designed to inform them of current topics of interest in competition law, practice and policy. These special programs introduce the fellows to the key policymakers in the public and private sectors. Each year, the institute sends fellows to the ABA Section of Antitrust Spring Meeting. In addition, fellows engage in externships with organizations such as the Federal Trade Commission, the Illinois Attorney General, public interest groups and private law firms.

The fellows write papers on timely antitrust and consumer protection issues, recent Supreme Court decisions and new developments in these fields.

Alumni of the Student Fellowship Program work at a wide variety of law firms, government agencies and corporate counsel offices. The institute has alumni who followed career paths at the U.S. Department of Justice Antitrust Division, the Consumer Financial Protection Bureau and Brooklyn Legal Services Foreclosure Defense.

In 2019 the Institute also began offering a new JD Certificate in Competition and Consumer Protection Law. The Certificate allows interested JD students to can strengthen their understanding of competition and consumer protection law and signal to employers their preparation within the field by earning the JD Certificate in Competition and Consumer Protection Law. In order to earn a certificate students must complete required coursework, a practical experience, and extracurricular activities.

Senior research fellow

The institute also sponsors a senior research fellow. Typically, the institute has one senior research fellow on staff at all times. Senior research fellows conduct research, write articles for publication, teach and engage in guest lecturing at the law school. In the past, Philipp Fabbio of the University of Reggio Calabria School of Law served as a senior research fellow. Professor Fabbio taught courses in EU Law and International and Comparative Antitrust.

Additionally, Marek Martyniszyn served as a senior research fellow. Dr. Martyniszyn joined the institute after having submitted his doctoral thesis, which was the result of his research conducted while he was the Ad Astra Research Scholar at the University College Dublin School of Law.
Former Illinois AG Neil Hartigan has joined Loyola's Institute for Consumer Antitrust Studies as a distinguished fellow in residence.

Events 

The institute holds a variety of programs that bring together legal scholars to talk about antitrust and consumer protection issues. Among many other events, the institute sponsors a brown bag lunch program that brings influential leaders in government and private practice to the institute to talk with Student Fellows about their experiences in antitrust and consumer protection law, and their careers.

The institute also invites members of other programs and clubs at Loyola University Chicago, School of Law, to the brown bag lunch events to encourage and facilitate an interdisciplinary focus of the institute as a whole.

Upcoming events

On June 5–6, 2016 the 4th Loyola-Haifa Antitrust Workshop on Antitrust and Changing Technology will take place at Haifa University in Israel.

On September 20, 2016, The institute will co-sponsor with the Antitrust Section of the ABA and the Beazely Health Law Institute a program on Health Care and Financial Services: Competition and Consumers in Regulated Industries.  This symposium will take place in the 10th Floor Ceremonial Courtroom at the Corboy Law Center.
 
The 7th Antitrust Marathon on Compliance will take place at the Pazmany Peter Catholic University in Budapest Hungary, October 2017.

A current list of past and upcoming programs is available here, at the institute's website.

Annual colloquium
Each April, since 2000, the institute sponsors its annual Loyola Antitrust Colloquium. The colloquium features presentations of cutting-edge academic papers followed by commentary from lawyers, economists, and professors. Past keynote speakers include Federal Trade Commissioners Julie Brill, Edith Ramirez, and William Kovacic.

The 16th Annual Loyola Antitrust Colloquium was held on April 15, 2016. Federal Trade Commissioner Terrell McSweeny delivered the keynote address.
Keynote Remarks of Commissioner Terrell McSweeny

The 15th Annual Loyola Antitrust Colloquium was held on April 24, 2015 David Gelfand, Deputy Assistant Attorney General for Litigation, Antitrust Division, U.S. Dep't of Justice delivered the keynote address.

The 14th Annual Loyola Antitrust Colloquium was held on April 25, 2014 Leslie C. Overton, Deputy Assistant Attorney General for Civil Enforcement, Antitrust Division, U.S. Dep't of Justice delivered the keynote address.

The 13th Annual Loyola Antitrust Colloquium was held on April 19, 2013 Patricia Brink, director of civil enforcement, Antitrust Division, U.S. Department of Justice, delivered the keynote address.

The 12th Annual Loyola Antitrust Colloquium was held on April 27, 2012.  Federal Trade Commissioner Julie Brill delivered the keynote address, which focused on privacy, consumer protection and competition.

The 11th Annual Loyola Antitrust Colloquium was held on April 29, 2011.  Federal Trade Commissioner Edith Ramirez delivered the keynote address.

The 10th Annual Loyola Antitrust Colloquium was held on April 30, 2010.

Antitrust Marathons

The "Antitrust Marathon" is a gathering of antitrust regulators, practitioners and academics on weekends of actual marathon races co-sponsored with the Competition Law Forum (CLF) of the British Institute of International and Comparative Law. In a spirit of Trans-Atlantic dialogue, the Antitrust Marathon series was conceived by Professor Spencer Weber Waller and Dr. Philip Marsden as a method to explore pressing antitrust issues from a comparative perspective.

“The Antitrust Marathon: A Roundtable Discussion,” was held on October 5, 2007 in Chicago, Illinois.  Over two-dozen antitrust scholars from Europe and North America met at Loyola University Chicago to discuss the comparative state of monopolization law.  The first Antitrust Marathon was co-sponsored by the institute and the British Institute of International and Comparative Law.  The issue papers and edited transcripts for the first Antitrust Marathon are available here.

“Antitrust Marathon: Part II,” was held on April 11, 2008 in London, England.  A number of antitrust scholars and practitioners from Europe and North America met at the Competition Appeal Tribunal in London to discuss the comparative state of monopolization law.  This meeting centered around four discussions: (I) 'European Economic Freedom: American Structuralism Revisited? What Room for Consumer Harm?'; (II) 'Abuse vs. Non-horizontal Mergers: Conflicting Theories of Harm?'; (III) 'Bundling: Are US and European Views Converging?'; and (IV) 'Remedies'. 
The issue papers and edited transcripts for the second Antitrust Marathon are available here.

“Antitrust Marathon III: Antitrust and the Rule of Law,” was held on April 17, 2009 in Cambridge, Massachusetts. The half-day roundtable discussion was based on a series of short issue papers about different aspects of the rule of law in both American antitrust law and EU competition law. The issue papers and an edited transcript appeared in the Loyola Consumer Law Review, available here.

“Antitrust Marathon IV: With Authority," was held on October 27, 2009 in Dublin, Ireland. This meeting centered around three discussions: (I) 'Competition law and Consumer Protection - the debate is no longer about whether these two should be integrated, the question now is how'; (II) 'Conflicts of Process vs. Conflicts of Values'; and (III) 'Institutional Design Generally: Administrative v Judicial Models, vs. Mixed.'

"Antitrust Marathon V: Public and Private Enforcement of Competition Law Italian Competition Authority” was held on March 18, 2013 in Rome, Italy.  This meeting centered around four discussions: (I) Public-Private Partnerships for Effective Enforcements, (II) Effective Injunctive Relief, (III)Private Rights of Damages, and (IV) Criminal Enforcement.

"Antitrust Marathon VII" will be held in October 2017 at Pazmany Peter Catholic University in Budapest Hungary on Compliance.

International events
The institute is involved with several foreign programs, in addition to the Antitrust Marathons that have been held abroad.

“Brands, Competition Law and IP Law Conference,” was held on December 2, 2011 in London, England.  The institute co-sponsored the event with the University College London Centre for Law, Economics & Society, and the University College London Institute of Brand and Innovation Law.

"Issues at the Forefront of Monopolization and Abuse of Dominance," was held from May 24–26, 2009.  The institute co-sponsored the program on monopolization with the University of Haifa at its campus in Israel. The program included presentations from faculty, scholars, and practitioners from the University of Haifa, Loyola University Chicago, Bar IIan University, University College London, Oxford University, the United States Federal Trade Commission, the Max Planck Institute, the British Institute of International & Comparative Law, Tel Aviv University, among others.

Education Immersion Weekends

In order to reinforce online learning objectives and foster communication between students and faculty, all online Global Competition Law MJ students are invited to come to Loyola's Chicago campus during their tenure in the program for an Education Immersion Weekend (EIW). During the EIW, held in late April of each year, MJ students attend the annual Loyola Antitrust Colloquium with national and international legal experts, attend LLM thesis presentations and other special programming, participate in graduation celebrations, and network and socialize with students, faculty, and alumni. Students are responsible for all travel and lodging expenses but most meals and entertainment will be provided.

Recent events
Demonstrating the depth and breadth of the institute's involvement in antitrust and consumer protection issues, the institute has hosted the following events over the past few years:

The Online Masters Global Competition Law Program will welcome its second class in the fall of 2016.

A lecture by Deepak Gupta, Esq., “Will Class Actions Survive the Robert’s Court? Concepcion, Italian Colors, and Beyond”, was held on September 27, 2013

“Hidden Traps, Fair Contracts, and Consumer Choice,” was held on January 27, 2012.

“Why Antitrust? A Discussion of Antitrust Law as a Career Option,” was held on November 2, 2011.

“Do Not Track: Privacy in the Internet Age,” was held on October 14, 2011.  At this event, the institute sponsored Federal Trade Commissioner J. Thomas Rosch.  A video of Commissioner Rosch's presentation is available here.

“Privacy and Data Security Relating to Medical Records,” was held on January 25, 2010.  Panelists included Loretta Garrison, Jerome (Jerry) Meites, and Elaine Zacharakis.

On September 11, 2009, the institute, in conjunction with the American Bar Association Section of Antitrust Law, hosted a conference of leading antitrust scholars from around the world to compare the enforcement of antitrust law throughout the world. Specifically, the discussion focused on the most conducive institutional structures for antitrust law enforcement.

Publications 
Competition Policy in the Global Economy, An On-line Casebook

Media Room

Newsletters

Working Papers

News & Views

Consumer Guide

Loyola Consumer Law Review

"Antitrust Goes Global" Spencer Waller

People 
Advisory Board

The Institute for Consumer Antitrust Studies maintains two Advisory Boards: an International Advisory Board and a Domestic Advisory Board.  The boards are composed of lawyers, professors and policymakers who advise the director and School of Law on issues and programs of interest to the antitrust community.

Faculty

Spencer Weber Waller, Director; Christine Chabot, Interim Director; Lea Krivinskas Shepard; James Thuo Gathii, Wing-Tat Lee Chair in International Law and Professor of Law

Adjunct and Visiting Faculty 

Ted Banks; Laura De Sanctis; Alan S. Frankel; David Marx, Jr.; Andre Fiebig; Dr. Michael Gal; Dr. James Langenfeld; and Dr. Philip Marsden.

Visiting Scholars 

2016: Ariel Ezrachi, Pembroke College, University of Oxford.

Distinguished Fellow in Residence 

Hon. Neil Hartigan

Staff

Evelyn Gonzalez, Administrator

Student Fellows

Class of 2015-16: Bailey Brandon; Ryan Marcus; Krystyna Kudlata; Maureen Moody; Marko Stojkovic; Angela Sukurs; Adrienne Yoseph.

Class of 2014-15: Kristine Bergman; Nicole Grabianowski; Duo Park; Andrea Reino; Ericka Taschler; James Ulwick

Class of 2013-14: Brandon Cabanaughl Patrick Gleeson; Greg Jones; Eric Olson; Ismael Salam.

Resources

Main sites
 Institute for Consumer Antitrust Studies
 Loyola University Chicago School of Law
 Loyola University Chicago

References 

Anti-competitive practices
Competition law
Consumer protection law
Loyola University Chicago School of Law
1994 establishments in Illinois
Consumer protection in the United States